Antinomy (Greek ἀντί, antí, "against, in opposition to", and νόμος, nómos, "law") refers to a real or apparent mutual incompatibility of two laws. It is a term used in logic and epistemology, particularly in the philosophy of Immanuel Kant.

There are many examples of antinomy. A self-contradictory phrase such as "There is no absolute truth" can be considered an antinomy because this statement is suggesting in itself to be an absolute truth, and therefore denies itself any truth in its statement. It is not necessarily also a paradox. A paradox, such as "this sentence is false" can also be considered to be an antinomy; in this case, for the sentence to be true, it must be false.

Kant's use

The term acquired a special significance in the philosophy of Immanuel Kant (1724–1804), who used it to describe the equally rational but contradictory results of applying to the universe of pure thought the categories or criteria of reason that are proper to the universe of sensible perception or experience (phenomena). Empirical reason cannot here play the role of establishing rational truths because it goes beyond possible experience and is applied to the sphere of that which transcends it.

For Kant there are four antinomies, connected with:
the limitation of the universe in respect to space and time
the theory that the whole consists of indivisible atoms (whereas, in fact, none such exist)
the problem of free will in relation to universal causality
the existence of a universal being

In each antinomy, a thesis is contradicted by an antithesis. For example: in the first antinomy, Kant proves the thesis that time must have a beginning by showing that if time had no beginning, then an infinity would have elapsed up until the present moment. This is a manifest contradiction because infinity cannot, by definition, be completed by "successive synthesis"—yet just such a finalizing synthesis would be required by the view that time is infinite; so the thesis is proven. Then he proves the antithesis, that time has no beginning, by showing that if time had a beginning, then there must have been "empty time" out of which time arose. This is incoherent (for Kant) for the following reason: Since, necessarily, no time elapses in this pretemporal void, then there could be no alteration, and therefore nothing (including time) would ever come to be: so the antithesis is proven. Reason makes equal claim to each proof, since they are both correct, so the question of the limits of time must be regarded as meaningless.

This was part of Kant's critical program of determining limits to science and philosophical inquiry. These contradictions are inherent in reason when it is applied to the world as it is in itself, independently of any perception of it (this has to do with the distinction between phenomena and noumena). Kant's goal in his critical philosophy was to identify what claims are and are not justified, and the antinomies are a particularly illustrative example of his larger project.

Marx's use

In Das Kapital, Volume I in the chapter entitled "The Working Day", Karl Marx claims that capitalist production sustains "the assertion of a right to an unlimited working day, and the assertion of a right to a limited working day, both with equal justification". Furner emphasizes that the thesis and antithesis of this antinomy are not contradictory opposites, but rather "consist in the assertion of rights to states of affairs that are contradictory opposites".

See also

Mutual incompatibility
Law:
Alternative pleading
Logic:
Mutual exclusivity
Kettle logic
Paradox
Religion:
Antinomianism (Christianity)
Others:
Oxymoron
Double bind

References

External links

 

Kantianism
Concepts in logic